Aymoré Moreira (24 April 1912 – 26 July 1998) was a Brazilian football player and coach, who played as a goalkeeper. He was a brother of Zezé Moreira and Ayrton Moreira, both of whom were also successful coaches in Brazilian football.

Career
Moreira was born in Miracema, Rio de Janeiro. He began his career as a right-winger, but soon he changed to become a goalkeeper, playing for América, Palestra Itália and Botafogo, where he remained from 1936 to 1946 and earned call-ups to the Brazil national team, the "Canarinho" (Portuguese, Little Canary).

After his retirement as a player, he became a successful coach, leading the Brazil national team to its second FIFA World Cup in (1962). In the first match against Mexico national team, Pelé assisted on the first goal and scored the second one, later injuring himself while attempting a long-range shot against Czechoslovakia national team. This kept him out of the remainder of the tournament and forced Moreira to make his only lineup change of the tournament; bringing in Amarildo. The replacement duly scored in the final, a rematch against Czechoslovakia. Garrincha starred in the 3–1 win.

Moreira managed Brazil national team for 61 matches, with 37 wins, 9 draws and 15 losses. Besides winning the World Cup, he led the "Canarinha" to win the Taça Oswaldo Cruz in 1961 and 1962, Taça Bernardo O'Higgins in 1961 and 1966, Roca Cup in 1963 and Taça Rio Branco in 1967.

Among the clubs he coached were Bangu, Palmeiras, Portuguesa, Botafogo, São Paulo, Galícia and Panathinaikos.

Moreira died in Salvador, Bahia, aged 86.

Honours

International
Brazil
FIFA World Cup: 1962
Taça Oswaldo Cruz: 1961, 1962
Taça Bernardo O'Higgins: 1961, 1966
Copa Roca: 1963
Taça Rio Branco: 1967

References

External links
Aymoré Moreira in the Sports Museum
Sitedalusa.com

1912 births
1998 deaths
Brazilian footballers
Brazil international footballers
Association football goalkeepers
Brazilian football managers
Brazilian expatriate football managers
Expatriate football managers in Portugal
Expatriate football managers in Greece
1962 FIFA World Cup managers
FIFA World Cup-winning managers
America Football Club (RJ) players
Sociedade Esportiva Palmeiras players
Botafogo de Futebol e Regatas players
Fluminense FC players
Olaria Atlético Clube managers
Bangu Atlético Clube managers
São Cristóvão de Futebol e Regatas managers
Sociedade Esportiva Palmeiras managers
Brazil national football team managers
Santos FC managers
Associação Portuguesa de Desportos managers
São Paulo FC managers
CR Flamengo managers
Sport Club Corinthians Paulista managers
Boavista F.C. managers
FC Porto managers
Panathinaikos F.C. managers
Botafogo de Futebol e Regatas managers
Associação Ferroviária de Esportes managers
Cruzeiro Esporte Clube managers
Esporte Clube Vitória managers
Esporte Clube Bahia managers
Galícia Esporte Clube managers
Brazilian expatriate sportspeople in Portugal
Sportspeople from Rio de Janeiro (state)